The 1956 U.S. National Championships (now known as the US Open) was a tennis tournament that took place on the outdoor grass courts at the West Side Tennis Club, Forest Hills in New York City, United States. The tournament ran from 31 August until 9 September. It was the 76th staging of the U.S. National Championships, and the fourth Grand Slam tennis event of the year.

Finals

Men's singles

 Ken Rosewall (AUS) defeated  Lew Hoad (AUS) 4–6, 6–2, 6–3, 6–3

Women's singles

 Shirley Fry (USA) defeated  Althea Gibson  (USA) 6–3, 6–4

Men's doubles
 Lew Hoad (AUS) /  Ken Rosewall (AUS) defeated  Ham Richardson (USA) /  Vic Seixas (USA) 6–2, 6–2, 3–6, 6–4

Women's doubles
 Louise Brough (USA) /  Margaret Osborne (USA) defeated  Shirley Fry (USA) /  Betty Pratt (USA) 6–3, 6–0

Mixed doubles
 Margaret Osborne (USA) /   Ken Rosewall (AUS) defeated  Darlene Hard (USA) /  Lew Hoad (AUS) 9–7, 6–1

References

External links
Official US Open website

 
U.S. National Championships
U.S. National Championships (tennis) by year
U.S. National Championships
U.S. National Championships
U.S. National Championships
U.S. National Championships